Richard Osborne is a former Australian rules footballer.

Richard Osborne may also refer to:

 Sir Richard Osborne, 1st Baronet (1593–1666/67), Irish baronet, lawyer and politician
 Sir Richard Osborne, 2nd Baronet (1618–1685), Irish baronet and politician
 Richard Osborne (American football) (born 1953), former American football tight end
 Richard Osborne (rugby union) (1848–1926), rugby union international who represented England in the first international in 1871
 Richard Osborne (singer) (born 1989), British singer/songwriter
 Richard Osborne (mentor), British businessman and mentor